Talkhari-ye Dam-e Deligerdu (also Romanized as Talkhārī-ye Dam-e Delīgerdū) is a village in Margown Rural District, Margown District, Boyer-Ahmad County, Kohgiluyeh and Boyer-Ahmad Province, Iran. At the 2006 census, its population was 37, in 8 families.

References 

Populated places in Boyer-Ahmad County